Justice Maynard may refer to:

Isaac H. Maynard, judge of the New York Court of Appeals
John Maynard (New York politician), justice of the New York Supreme Court and ex officio a judge of the New York Court of Appeals
Spike Maynard, associate justice of the Supreme Court of Appeals of West Virginia